Emin Guliyev may refer to:

 Emin Quliyev (born 1977), former Azerbaijani football player and now coach
 Emin Guliyev (swimmer) (born 1975), retired Azerbaijani swimmer